Reality vs. The Optimist is the debut album by Kiss Kiss, released on February 6, 2007 on Eyeball Records. They created a music video for the song "Machines." The band also recorded a live music video for the song "The Cats In Your House".

Track listing

References

Kiss Kiss (band) albums
2007 debut albums